Templewood Primary School is a primary school in Pentley Park, Welwyn Garden City, Hertfordshire, England. It is one of a number of modernist schools commissioned by the Hertfordshire County Council in the 20th century and is a Grade II* listed building.

References

Grade II* listed buildings in Hertfordshire
Primary schools in Hertfordshire
Schools in Welwyn Garden City
Prefabricated buildings
Modernist architecture in England
Grade II* listed schools
Community schools in Hertfordshire
Educational institutions with year of establishment missing